Kabala is a village in the Artuklu District of Mardin Province in Turkey. The village is populated by Arabs, Kurds and the Mhallami and had a population of 8,519 in 2021.

History 
Kabala is a former Jewish settlement which today is predominately Arab with moreover a Kurdish population. Kurdish tribes in the village are the Dereveri, Hesinan and the Omerkan.

References 

Villages in Artuklu District
Kurdish settlements in Mardin Province
Arab settlements in Mardin Province
Mhallami villages
Historic Jewish communities in Asia